Rashid Bawa is a Ghanaian politician, diplomat and a member of the New Patriotic Party of Ghana. He is currently Ghana's ambassador to Nigeria.

He had previously served as Ghana's ambassador to Saudi Arabia. He is a former Member of Parliament.

He was the member of parliament for Akan Constituency of the republic of Ghana from 7 January 2001 to 6 January 2005 as an independent.

Ambassadorial appointment 
In June 2017, President Nana Akuffo-Addo named Rashid Bawa as Ghana's ambassador to Nigeria. He was among eight other distinguished Ghanaians who were named to head various diplomatic Ghanaian mission in the world.

Politics 
Bawa was an independent candidate in the 3rd Parliament of the 4th Parliament of the 4th Republic of Ghana. He was elected as the member of parliament for the Akan constituency in the Volta region in the 3rd parliament of the 4th republic of Ghana.

Bawa was elected as the member of parliament for the Akan constituency in the 2000 Ghanaian general elections. He was an independent candidate for the said elections.

His constituency was the second independent candidate to win the said election in the Volta Region.  He was elected with 12,306 votes out of 22,533 total valid votes cast.

This was equivalent to 54.9% of the total valid votes cast. He was elected over John K. Gyapong of the National Democratic Congress, Kofi Asiedu-Mensah of the New Patriotic Party, Gibson-Godfried Akromah of the Convention People's Party and Peter K.E. Ansah of the National Reformed Party.

These obtained 9,386, 536, 196 and 0 votes respectively out of the total valid votes cast. These were equivalent to 41.9%, 2.4%, 0.9% and 0% respectively of total valid votes cast.

References

Year of birth missing (living people)
Living people
High Commissioners of Ghana to Nigeria
New Patriotic Party politicians
Ghanaian MPs 2001–2005
21st-century Ghanaian politicians
People from Volta Region